Thambi Naransamy Naidoo or Roy Naidoo (1901-1953) was a South African political activist. He was of South African Indian Tamil descent. He is the son of an early collaborator of Mahatma Gandhi, Thambi Naidoo. He was married to another activist Amma Naidoo

He was born in 1901 in Pietermaritzburg, Colony of Natal. He was adopted by the family of Mahatma Mohandas Gandhi and went to India for his education, where he studied under the poet Rabindranath Tagore. He became a trade unionist and leader of bakery workers on the Rand.

In 1946 he helped organise the campaign by Indians against the Asiatic Land Tenure and Indian Representation Act; he served two terms of imprisonment for passive resistance. He was active again in the 1952 Defiance Campaign and also served as vice-president of the Transvaal Indian Congress and chairman of the Transvaal Peace Council. He died in 1953. He was the father of Shanti Naidoo and Indres Naidoo, both active opponents of the South African regime.

References
Gerhart G.M and Karis T. (ed)(1977). From Protest to challenge: A documentary History of African Politics in South Africa: 1882–1964, Vol.4 Political Profiles 1882 ? 1964. Hoover Institution Pres: Stanford University

1901 births
1953 deaths
South African people of Tamil descent
People from Pietermaritzburg
South African Indian Congress politicians
South African politicians of Indian descent
South African expatriates in India